The Ararat Football Club, nicknamed the Rats,  is an Australian rules football and netball club based in the city of Ararat, Victoria. The football team currently competes in the Wimmera Football League (WFL).

History
Formed in 1871, Ararat won eight premierships in the Wimmera and District Football Association during the early 20th century. From 1924 to 1928, they played in the Ballarat Football League. They did not return to the Wimmera league until 1930, as they were forced to sit out of the competition for a year as punishment for their earlier defection. From 1934 to 1936 they took part in Ballarat-Wimmera FL.

The Wimmera Football League was reformed in 1937 and Ararat have participated since the beginning. They are the second most successful club in the league in terms of premierships, behind Horsham. Their greatest era came in the 1950s when they won four consecutive premierships, under former Essendon player Percy Bushby.

Premierships
 Wimmera Football League (11):
 1949, 1951, 1955, 1956, 1957, 1958, 1971, 1975, 1986, 1999, 2001

VFL/AFL players

 Ted Brown - AFC 1911-13, 20 games > Carlton 1914-20, 95 games
Dave Crone - AFC 1913, 8 games > Fitzroy 3 games > Carlton 1917-20, 22 games
Tom Byrne - AFC 1927, 18 games > Carlton 1929, 4 games > Hawthorn 1935-39 61 games
Henry Thomson - AFC 1925-28, 58 games > Carlton 1930, 1 game
Jim Williamson - AFC 1928, 30-31 38 games > Carlton 1930, 1 game
Henry Ogilvie - AFC 1958-61, 64, 55 games > Carlton 1962-63, 2 games
Tom Williamson - AFC 2014-15, 12 games > Carlton 2017-, 18 games
Alan Young - AFC 1952-53, 19 games > Collingwood 1954, 3 games
Barry Price - AFC 20 games > Collingwood 1966-75, 79, 158 games
Lex Pritchard - AFC 1971-74, 23 games > Colloingwood 1976-77 3 games
Neil Peart - AFC 1976, 80, 29 games > Collingwood 1982, 13 games > Richmond 1983-84, 86, 40 games > Footscray 1985, 9 games
Chris Dalkin - AFC 1978-81, 86, 93, 61 games > Collingwood 1982-83, 85, 18 games
William Harvey - AFC 1911 8 games > Essendon 1912, 3 games
Doug Tassell - AFC 1967-69 84 games > Essendon 1969-70, 20 games
Barry Grinter - AFC 1969 15 games > Essendon 1971-72, 74-76, 78 games > Richmond 1978, 6 games
Lauchlan Dalgleish - AFC 2009-11, 12 games > Essendon 2013, 3 games
Daryl Peoples - AFC 1962-65, 64 games > Fitzroy 1965-70, 77 games
Terry Brady - AFC 1962-68, 115 games > Fitzroy 1965, 1 game
Henry Power - AFC 1924, 1926–28, 22 games > Footscray 1927, 2 games
Eugene Sullivan - AFC 1927-28, 35, 37, 33 games > Footscray 1928, 3 games
William Burns - AFC 1904-06, 10 games > Geelong 1904 2 games
Milton White - AFC 1922 4 games > Geelong 1928-29, 6 games
Ian O'Halloran - AFC 1956-57, 18 games > Geelong 1957, 3 games
Stuart Stewart - AFC 1924-25, 18 games > Hawthorn 1926-35 130 games
Fred Sleeman - AFC 1905, 7 games > Melbourne 1906, 14 games
William Smeaton - AFC 1948-50, 65-56 > Melbourne 1951-52, 17 games
Jack Clark - AFC 1946-51, 55.56, 59, 113 games > Nth Melbourne 1951, 2 games
Kevin Fitzgerald - AFC 1960, 13 games > Richmond 1961, 1 game
Scott Turner - AFC 1987-88, 90, 06, 08-12, 59 games > Richmond 1991-00, 144 games
Joe Garbutt - AFC 1925-26, 22 games > St Kilda 1935, 7 games
Harry 'Duxie' Gibson - AFC 1897-08, 10, 68 games > Sth Melbourne 1904-06, 41 games
Gerald Brennan - AFC 1957-61, 67, 70 games > Sth Melbourne 1958, 60, 7 games

References

Ted Brown (Ararat Football Club) Carlton Football Club also played with St Kilda FC 1911, 4 games 1 goal (Reference: Wikipedia)

External links

 Facebook page

Sports clubs established in 1871
Australian rules football clubs established in 1871
Ararat, Victoria
1871 establishments in Australia
Wimmera Football League clubs
Netball teams in Victoria (Australia)